Amanda Williams may refer to:
 Amanda Williams (judge)
 Amanda Williams (artist)
 Amanda Williams (cricketer)
 Amanda Kyle Williams, American crime writer